Ghik-e Sheykhha (also Romanized as Ghīk-e Sheykhhā; also known as Ghaik, Ghīk, and Ghīk-e Sheykhān) is a village in Garmsar Rural District, Jebalbarez-e Jonubi District, Anbarabad County, Kerman Province, Iran. At the 2006 census, its population was 155, in 36 families.

References 

Populated places in Anbarabad County